This is a list of world champions in women's water polo since the inaugural official edition in 1986.

Abbreviations

History
The 1986 Women's World Water Polo Championship was the first edition of the women's water polo tournament at the World Aquatics Championships, organized by the world governing body in aquatics, the FINA.

As of 2022, women's water polo teams from seven countries won all 15 tournaments.

United States is the most successful country in women's water polo tournament at the World Aquatics Championships, with seven gold medals.

Hungary and Italy have both won two World titles in women's water polo tournament.

The United States women's national team is current world champion.

Legend

  – Debut
  – Champion
  – Winning streak (winning three or more world championships in a row)
  – Hosts

Team statistics

Results

Olympic and world champions (teams)

Player statistics

Age records
The following tables show the oldest and youngest female world champions in water polo.

Legend
  – Host team

Multiple gold medalists
The following tables are pre-sorted by date of receiving the last gold medal (in ascending order), date of receiving the first gold medal (in ascending order), name of the player (in ascending order), respectively.

There are three female athletes who won three gold medals in water polo at the World Aquatics Championships.

There are ten female athletes who won three gold medals in water polo at the World Aquatics Championships.

Legend
 * – Host team

There are twenty-three female athletes who won two gold medals in water polo at the World Aquatics Championships.

Legend
 * – Host team

Olympic and world champions (players)

World champion families
The following tables are pre-sorted by date of receiving the gold medal (in ascending order), name of the player (in ascending order), respectively.

Legend
 * – Host team

Coach statistics

Most successful coaches
The following table is pre-sorted by number of gold medals (in descending order), date of winning the last gold medal (in ascending order), name of the coach (in ascending order), respectively.

There are three coaches who led women's national water polo teams to win two or more gold medals at the World Aquatics Championships.

American Adam Krikorian led the United States women's national team to win four gold medals at the World Aquatics Championships. His compatriot Guy Baker guided the United States women's national team to two gold medals in 2003 and 2007.

Italian Pierluigi Formiconi coached the Italy women's national team to two consecutive gold medals at the World Aquatics Championships in 1998 and 2001.

Legend
 * – Host team

Champions as coach and player

The following table is pre-sorted by number of gold medals (in descending order), date of winning the last gold medal (in ascending order), name of the person (in ascending order), respectively.

Only one water polo player won a gold medal at the World Aquatics Championships and then guided a women's national water polo team to the world title as a head coach.

Tamás Faragó of Hungary won a gold medal at the 1973 World Aquatics Championships. Thirty-two years later, he coached the Hungary women's national team to the world title in 2005.

Legend
 * – Host team

Olympic and world champions (coaches)

Champions by tournament

2019 (United States, 6th title)
 Edition of women's tournament: 14th
 Host city:  Gwangju, South Korea
 Number of participating teams: 16
 Competition format: Round-robin pools advanced teams to classification matches
 Champion:  (6th title; 1st place in preliminary A group)

Source: Official Results Books (PDF): 2019 (Women's Competition Schedule, Women's Round Summary).

 Head coach:  Adam Krikorian (4th title as head coach)
 Assistant coach:  Daniel Klatt

Note: Aria Fischer and Makenzie Fischer are sisters.
Sources:
 Official Results Books (PDF): 2019 (Team Roster – United States);
 ISHOF.

Abbreviation

 MP – Matches played
 Min – Minutes
 G – Goals
 Sh – Shots
 TF – Turnover fouls
 ST – Steals
 RB – Rebounds
 BL – Blocked shots
 SP – Sprints
 20S – 20 seconds exclusion
 DE – Double exclusion
 Pen – Penalty
 EX – Exclusion

Source: Official Results Books (PDF): 2019 (Cumulative Statistics – United States, p. 3).

2017 (United States, 5th title)
 Edition of women's tournament: 13th
 Host city:  Budapest, Hungary
 Number of participating teams: 16
 Competition format: Round-robin pools advanced teams to classification matches
 Champion:  (5th title; 1st place in preliminary B group)

Source: Official Results Books (PDF): 2017 (Women's Competition Schedule, Women's Round Summary).

 Head coach:  Adam Krikorian (3rd title as head coach)
 Assistant coaches:  Chris Oeding,  Ethan Damato

Note: Aria Fischer and Makenzie Fischer are sisters.
Sources:
 Official Results Books (PDF): 2017 (Team Roster – United States);
 ISHOF.

Abbreviation

 MP – Matches played
 Min – Minutes
 G – Goals
 Sh – Shots
 AS – Assists
 TF – Turnover fouls
 ST – Steals
 BL – Blocked shots
 SP – Sprints
 20S – 20 seconds exclusion
 DE – Double exclusion
 Pen – Penalty
 EX – Exclusion

Source: Official Results Books (PDF): 2017 (Cumulative Statistics – United States, p. 3).

2015 (United States, 4th title)
 Edition of women's tournament: 12th
 Host city:  Kazan, Russia
 Number of participating teams: 16
 Competition format: Round-robin pools advanced teams to classification matches
 Champion:  (4th title; 2nd place in preliminary C group)

Source: Official Results Books (PDF): 2015 (Women's Competition Schedule, Women's Round Summary).

 Head coach:  Adam Krikorian (4th title as head coach)
 Assistant coaches:  Daniel Klatt,  Chris Oeding

Sources:
 Official Results Books (PDF): 2015 (Team Roster – United States);
 ISHOF.

Abbreviation

 MP – Matches played
 Min – Minutes
 G – Goals
 Sh – Shots
 AS – Assists
 TF – Turnover fouls
 ST – Steals
 RB – Rebounds
 BL – Blocked shots
 SP – Sprints
 20S – 20 seconds exclusion
 DE – Double exclusion
 Pen – Penalty
 EX – Exclusion

Source: Official Results Books (PDF): 2015 (Cumulative Statistics – United States, p. 2).

2013 (Spain, 1st title)

 Edition of women's tournament: 11th
 Host city:  Barcelona, Spain
 Number of participating teams: 16
 Competition format: Round-robin pools advanced teams to classification matches
 Champion:  (1st title; 2nd place in preliminary A group)

Source: Official Results Books (PDF): 2013 (Women's Competition Schedule, Women's Round Summary).

 Head coach:  Miki Oca (1st title as head coach)
 Assistant coach:  Claudio Cardarona

Sources:
 Official Results Books (PDF): 2013 (Team Roster – Spain);
 ISHOF: "Honorees by Country".

Abbreviation

 MP – Matches played
 Min – Minutes
 G – Goals
 Sh – Shots
 AS – Assists
 TF – Turnover fouls
 ST – Steals
 BL – Blocked shots
 SP – Sprints
 20S – 20 seconds exclusion
 DE – Double exclusion
 Pen – Penalty
 EX – Exclusion

Source: Official Results Books (PDF): 2013 (Cumulative Statistics – Spain, p. 2).

2011 (Greece, 1st title)
 Edition of women's tournament: 10th
 Host city:  Shanghai, China
 Number of participating teams: 16
 Competition format: Round-robin pools advanced teams to classification matches
 Champion:  (1st title; place in preliminary C group)

Source: Official Results Books (PDF): 2011 (Women's Competition Schedule, Women's Round Summary).

 Head coach:  Giorgos Morfesis (1st title as head coach)

Sources:
 Official Results Books (PDF): 2011 (Team Roster – Greece);
 ISHOF: "Honorees by Country".

Abbreviation

 MP – Matches played
 Min – Minutes
 G – Goals
 Sh – Shots
 AS – Assists
 TF – Turnover fouls
 ST – Steals
 BL – Blocked shots
 SP – Sprints
 20S – 20 seconds exclusion
 Pen – Penalty
 EX – Exclusion

Source: Official Results Books (PDF): 2011 (Cumulative Statistics – Greece, p. 3).

2009 (United States, 3rd title)
 Edition of women's tournament: 9th
 Host city:  Rome, Italy
 Number of participating teams: 16
 Competition format: Round-robin pools advanced teams to classification matches
 Champion:  (3rd title; 2nd place in preliminary B group)

Source: Official Results Books (PDF): 2009 (Women's Competition Schedule, Women's Round Summary).

 Head coach:  Adam Krikorian (1st title as head coach)
 Assistant coach:  Brandon Brooks

Sources:
 Official Results Books (PDF): 2009 (Team Roster – United States);
 ISHOF: "Honorees by Country".

Abbreviation

 MP – Matches played
 Min – Minutes
 G – Goals
 Sh – Shots
 AS – Assists
 TF – Turnover fouls
 ST – Steals
 BL – Blocked shots
 SP – Sprints
 20S – 20 seconds exclusion
 Pen – Penalty
 EX – Exclusion

Source: Official Results Books (PDF): 2009 (Cumulative Statistics – United States, p. 2).

2007 (United States, 2nd title)
 Edition of women's tournament: 8th
 Host city:  Melbourne, Australia
 Number of participating teams: 16
 Competition format: Round-robin pools advanced teams to classification matches
 Champion:  (2nd title; 1st place in preliminary C group)

Source: Official Results Books (PDF): 2007 (Women's Round Summary).

 Head coach:  Guy Baker (2nd title as head coach)
 Assistant coach:  Heather Moody

Sources:
 Official Results Books (PDF): 2007 (Start Lists – United States: match 05, match 11, match 20, match 37, match 44, match 48);
 ISHOF: "Honorees by Country".

Abbreviation

 MP – Matches played
 Min – Minutes
 G – Goals
 Sh – Shots
 AS – Assists
 TF – Turnover fouls
 ST – Steals
 BL – Blocked shots
 SP – Sprints
 20S – 20 seconds exclusion
 Pen – Penalty
 EX – Exclusion

Source: Official Results Books (PDF): 2007 (Results – United States: match 05, match 11, match 20, match 37, match 44, match 48).

2005 (Hungary, 2nd title)
 Edition of women's tournament: 7th
 Host city:  Montreal, Canada
 Number of participating teams: 16
 Competition format: Round-robin pools advanced teams to classification matches
 Champion:  (2nd title; 1st place in preliminary B group)

Sources:
 Official Reports (FINA) (PDF): "World Championship" (p. 57);
 Todor66: "2005 World Championship (women's tournament)".

 Head coach:  Tamás Faragó (1st title as head coach)
 Assistant coach:  Mátyás Petrovics

Sources:
 Official Reports (FINA) (PDF): "World Champions–Team Line-up" (p. 57);
 Olympedia: "Olympians Who Won a Medal at the World Aquatics Championships";
 ISHOF: "Honorees by Country".

2003 (United States, 1st title)
 Edition of women's tournament: 6th
 Host city:  Barcelona, Spain
 Number of participating teams: 16
 Competition format: Round-robin pools advanced teams to classification matches
 Champion:  (1st title; 1st place in preliminary C group)

Sources:
 Official Reports (FINA) (PDF): "World Championship" (p. 57);
 Todor66: "2003 World Championship (women's tournament)".

 Head coach:  Guy Baker (1st title as head coach)

Sources:
 Official Reports (FINA) (PDF): "World Champions–Team Line-up" (p. 57);
 Olympedia: "Olympians Who Won a Medal at the World Aquatics Championships";
 ISHOF: "Honorees by Country".

2001 (Italy, 2nd title)
 Edition of women's tournament: 5th
 Host city:  Fukuoka, Japan
 Number of participating teams: 12
 Competition format: Round-robin pools advanced teams to classification matches
 Champion:  (2nd title; 3rd place in preliminary A group)

Sources:
 Official Reports (FINA) (PDF): "World Championship" (p. 57);
 Todor66: "2001 World Championship (women's tournament)".

 Head coach:  Pierluigi Formiconi (2nd title as head coach)

Sources:
 Official Reports (FINA) (PDF): "World Champions–Team Line-up" (p. 57);
 Olympedia: "Olympians Who Won a Medal at the World Aquatics Championships";
 ISHOF: "Honorees by Country".

1998 (Italy, 1st title)
 Edition of women's tournament: 4th
 Host city:  Perth, Australia
 Number of participating teams: 12
 Competition format: Round-robin pools advanced teams to classification matches
 Champion:  (1st title; 4th place in preliminary B group)

Sources:
 Official Reports (FINA) (PDF): "World Championship" (p. 57);
 Todor66: "1998 World Championship (women's tournament)".

 Head coach:  Pierluigi Formiconi (1st title as head coach)

Sources:
 Official Reports (FINA) (PDF): "World Champions–Team Line-up" (p. 57);
 Olympedia: "Olympians Who Won a Medal at the World Aquatics Championships";
 ISHOF: "Honorees by Country".

1994 (Hungary, 1st title)
 Edition of women's tournament: 3rd
 Host city:  Rome, Italy
 Number of participating teams: 12
 Competition format: Round-robin pools advanced teams to classification matches
 Champion:  (1st title; 2nd place in preliminary A group)

Sources:
 Official Reports (FINA) (PDF): "World Championship" (p. 57);
 Todor66: "1994 World Championship (women's tournament)".

Head coach:  Gyula Tóth (1st title as head coach)

Sources:
 Official Reports (FINA) (PDF): "World Champions–Team Line-up" (p. 57);
 Olympedia: "Olympians Who Won a Medal at the World Aquatics Championships";
 ISHOF: "Honorees by Country".

1991 (Netherlands, 1st title)
 Edition of women's tournament: 2nd
 Host city:  Perth, Australia
 Number of participating teams: 9
 Competition format: Round-robin pools advanced teams to classification matches
 Champion:  (1st title; 1st place in preliminary A group)

Sources:
 Official Reports (FINA) (PDF): "World Championship" (p. 57);
 Todor66: "1991 World Championship (women's tournament)".

 Head coach:  Peter van den Biggelaar (1st title as head coach)

Sources:
 Official Reports (FINA) (PDF): "World Champions–Team Line-up" (p. 57);
 Olympedia: "Olympians Who Won a Medal at the World Aquatics Championships";
 ISHOF: "Honorees by Country".

1986 (Australia, 1st title)
 Edition of women's tournament: 1st
 Host city:  Madrid, Spain
 Number of participating teams: 9
 Competition format: Round-robin pools advanced teams to the round-robin final pool
 Champion:  (1st title; 1st place in preliminary B group)

Sources:
 Official Reports (FINA) (PDF): "World Championship" (p. 57);
 Todor66: "1986 World Championship (women's tournament)".

Head coach: 

Sources:
 Official Reports (FINA) (PDF): "World Champions–Team Line-up" (p. 57);
 Olympedia: "Olympians Who Won a Medal at the World Aquatics Championships";
 ISHOF: "Honorees by Country".

See also
 Water polo at the World Aquatics Championships
 List of world champions in men's water polo
 List of World Aquatics Championships women's water polo tournament records and statistics
 List of World Aquatics Championships men's water polo tournament records and statistics
 List of World Aquatics Championships medalists in water polo
 List of Olympic champions in women's water polo
 List of Olympic champions in men's water polo

Notes

References

Sources

ISHOF

External links
 Official website of the FINA

Women
Champions, Women
Water polo
Female water polo players